This is a list of seasons completed by the Nicholls Colonels football team of the National Collegiate Athletic Association (NCAA) Division I Football Championship Subdivision (FCS), representing Nicholls State University in the Southland Conference. Nicholls plays their home games at Manning Field at John L. Guidry Stadium in Thibodaux, Louisiana. Nicholls' first fielded a football team in 1972.

Seasons
Statistics correct as of the end of the 2022 Season

Sources:

References

Nicholls

Nicholls Colonels football seasons